Events from the year 1944 in Michigan.

Top stories
The Associated Press polled editors of its member newspapers in Michigan and ranked the state's top news stories of 1944 as follows:
 Judge Leland Carr's grand jury investigation into graft in the Michigan Legislature (213 points)
 Dewey loses Michigan to Roosevelt
 Gov. Kelly defeats Frank McKay as Republican national committeeman
 Strike hamper war production
 Detroit Tigers finish in second place in the American League, one game out of first
 Principals of Detroit spy ring sentenced to long terms
 Fisher Brothers leave General Motors to found their own company
 The acquittal of David Filgas in the torch death of Patricia Winters
 Mistakes snarl vote-counting in November election

Office holders

State office holders

 Governor of Michigan: Harry Kelly (Republican)
 Lieutenant Governor of Michigan: Eugene C. Keyes (Republican) 
 Michigan Attorney General: Herbert J. Rushton (Republican)
 Michigan Secretary of State: Herman H. Dignan (Republican)
 Speaker of the Michigan House of Representatives: Howard Nugent (Republican) 
 Chief Justice, Michigan Supreme Court:

Mayors of major cities

 Mayor of Detroit: Edward Jeffries (Republican)
 Mayor of Grand Rapids: George W. Welsh (Republican)
 Mayor of Flint: William Osmund Kelly/Edwin C. McLogan
 Mayor of Lansing: Ralph Crego
 Mayor of Saginaw: Eric F. Wieneke

Federal office holders

 U.S. Senator from Michigan: Homer S. Ferguson (Republican)
 U.S. Senator from Michigan: Arthur Vandenberg (Republican) 
 House District 1: George G. Sadowski (Democrat)
 House District 2: Earl C. Michener (Republican)
 House District 3: Paul W. Shafer (Republican)
 House District 4: Clare Hoffman (Republican)
 House District 5: Bartel J. Jonkman (Republican)
 House District 6: William W. Blackney (Republican)
 House District 7: Jesse P. Wolcott (Republican)
 House District 8: Fred L. Crawford (Republican)
 House District 9: Albert J. Engel (Republican)
 House District 10: Roy O. Woodruff (Republican)
 House District 11: Frederick Van Ness Bradley (Republican)
 House District 12: John B. Bennett (Republican)
 House District 13: George D. O'Brien (Democrat)
 House District 14: Louis C. Rabaut (Democrat)
 House District 15: John D. Dingell Sr. (Democrat)
 House District 16: John Lesinski Sr. (Democrat)
 House District 17: George Anthony Dondero (Republican)

Population

Companies
The following is a list of major companies based in Michigan in 1944.

Sports

Baseball

 1944 Detroit Tigers season – The Tigers compiled an 88–66 record and finished one game behind the St. Louis Browns. The team had one of the best pitching staffs in club history. Hal Newhouser was selected as the American League Most Valuable Player after compiling a 29–9 record and leading the league with 187 strikeouts. Dizzy Trout finished second in the AL MVP voting after leading the league with a 2.12 earned run average, 33 complete games, and seven shutouts. The team's batting leaders included first baseman Rudy York with 18 home runs and 98 RBIs and Dick Wakefield with a .355 batting average.
 1944 Michigan Wolverines baseball season - Under head coach Ray Fisher, the Wolverines compiled a 15–4–1 record and won the Big Ten Conference championship. Howard Wike was the team captain.

American football

 1944 Detroit Lions season – Under head coach Gus Dorais, the Lions compiled a 6–3–1 record and finished second in the NFL's Western Conference. Frankie Sinkwich led the team with 1,060 passing yards and 563 rushing yards. Bob Westfall added 342 passing yards and 277 rushing yards. 
 1944 Michigan Wolverines football team – Under head coach Fritz Crisler, the Wolverines compiled an 8–2 record, outscored opponents 204 to 91, finished in second place in the Big Nine Conference, and were ranked No. 8 in the final AP Poll. Tackle Milan Lazetich, quarterback Joe Ponsetto, and fullback Bob Wiese were selected as first-team players on the All-Big Ten Conference team.
 1944 Michigan State Spartans football team – Under head coach Charlie Bachman, the Spartans compiled a 6–1 record and outscored opponents 167 to 31.
 1944 Western Michigan Broncos football team - Under head coach John Gill, the Broncos compiled a 4–3 record and outscored their opponents, 162 to 123. 
 1944 Central Michigan Chippewas football team - Under head coach Ron Finch, the Chippewas compiled a 5–2 record and outscored all opponents by a combined total of 150 to 106.

Basketball
 1943–44 Western Michigan Broncos men's basketball team – Under head coach Buck Read, the Broncos compiled a 15–4 record.
 1943–44 Michigan Wolverines men's basketball team – Under head coach Bennie Oosterbaan, the Wolverines finished the season in a tie for sixth place in the Big Nine Conference with a 12–7 record. Dave Strack was the team's acting captain and led the team in scoring with 194 points.
 1943–44 Detroit Titans men's basketball team – Under head coach Lloyd Brazil, the Titans compiled a 13–7 record.

Ice hockey
 1943–44 Detroit Red Wings season –  Under head coach Jack Adams, the Red Wings compiled a 26–18–6 record, finished second in the NHL, and lost to the Chicago Black Hawks in the playoffs. Carl Liscombe led the team with 36 goals, 37 assists, and 73 points. Connie Dion and Jimmy Franks were the goaltenders.
 1943–44 Michigan Wolverines men's ice hockey team – The Wolverines compiled a 5–3 record under head coach Ed Lowrey.

Other

 Joe Louis - On November 14, in his first fight since 1942, Detroit's Joe Louis defeated Johnny Davis by a knockout after 53 seconds of the first round before 7,107 spectators at Memorial Auditorium in Buffalo, New York. Louis fought while on a 21-day furlough from his Army service.
 Michigan Open - Sam Byrd won the tournament at Orchard Lake on August 6.
 Port Huron to Mackinac Boat Race – On July 15, the Manitour, a 64-foot yawl skippered by James H. Grove, crossed the finish line first with an elapsed time of 43:08.18. The sloop Vitesse II won the racing-cruiser division.

Chronology of events

Births
 January 13 – Larry Jaster, Major League Baseball pitcher (1965–1972), in Midland, Michigan
 January 16 – Katherine Anderson, original member of the girl group The Marvelettes, in Ann Arbor
 February 6 – Georgeanna Tillman, original member of the girl group The Marvelettes, in Inkster, Michigan
 March 26 - Diana Ross, singer, songwriter, and actress, and the lead singer of the vocal group The Supremes, in Detroit
 April 20 – John Anderson, NASCAR Winston Cup Series driver (1979–1983), in Warren, Michigan
 May 5 – Larry Brilliant, epidemiologist involved in eradicating smallpox, in Detroit
 June 8 – Ken Wilburn, professional basketball player (1966–1979), in River Rouge, Michigan
 July 12 – Denise Nicholas, actress (Room 222, In the Heat of the Night) and civil rights activist, in Detroit
 July 14 – Ike Kelley, NFL linebacker for the Philadelphia Eagles (1966–1973), in Ludington, Michigan
 July 22 – Mel Daniels, professional basketball player (1967–1976) and 2× ABA MVP (1969, 1971), in Detroit
 July 26 – Micki King, gold medalist in springboard diving at 1972 Summer Olympics, in Pontiac
 July 31 – Henry Akin, professional basketball player (1966–1969), in Detroit
 August 28 – Morry Taylor, president and CEO of Titan International, in Detroit
 September 16 – Michael McCoy, industrial designer and educator, in Eaton Rapids, Michigan
 September 18 – Terry Rakolta, anti-obscenity activist who led a 1989 boycott of Married... with Children, in Bloomfield Hills, Michigan
 September 19 – Michael Barone, conservative political analyst, pundit and journalism, in Highland Park, Michigan
 September 26 – Doug Graber, American football coach, including head coach for Rutgers (1990–1995) and Frankfurt Galaxy (2001–2003), in Detroit
 September 28 – Marcia Muller, author of fictional mystery and thriller novels (Vanishing Point), in Detroit
 November 14 – Tom McEvoy, professional poker player and member of the Poker Hall of Fame, in Grand Rapids
 December 12 – Rob Tyner, lead singer for the Detroit proto-punk band MC5 known for his rallying cry of "kick out the jams, motherfuckers" at the band's live concerts

Deaths
 April 20 - Elmer Gedeon, track and baseball player at University of Michigan, at age 27, shot down in France
 December 25 - Frank Murphy, 44th Lieutenant Governor of Michigan (1941-1942), at age 47, in Detroit

See also
 History of Michigan
 History of Detroit

References